Barbosa is a municipality in the state of São Paulo in Brazil. The population is 7,468 (2020 est.) in an area of 205 km². The elevation is 386 m.

References

Municipalities in São Paulo (state)